Dragonheart: Vengeance is a 2020 fantasy adventure film directed by Ivan Silvestrini. It is the third direct-to-video prequel of the 1996 film, Dragonheart. The film begins before the events of Dragonheart: Battle for the Heartfire, but ends after them. It was released on Netflix, DVD, and Blu-ray on February 4, 2020.

Plot

In the years following Drago and Gareth's bonding, the seven dragons they raised left to different lands; one of them, a female named Siveth, traveled to Wallachia. The kingdom and its ruler, King Razvan, initially welcomed Siveth, but after he was wounded in battle, Siveth refused to share her heart with him, so the king exiled her. Twenty or thirty years after, Lukas, a young farmer, sees savage raiders: The Bear, The Wolf, The Snake, and The Scorpion, kill his family. After losing his parents and house to them, Lukas leaves on a quest for revenge. Lukas goes to the city where King Razvan rules, begging for help, only to be turned down. Later, a swashbuckling mercenary, Darius, approaches Lukas, offering his services to hunt the murderers. A brawl breaks out between Darius and a rival group of mercenaries, forcing Lukas to flee. He learns from a blacksmith he meets that Siveth might help him.

Lukas travels deep into the countryside to find Siveth, offering her a bag of crop seed as payment. Realizing that Lukas wants vengeance instead of justice, Siveth refuses to help, so Lukas leaves. He soon finds a horse with a saddle and supplies to aid him in his journey. Darius, who followed him, teaches Lukas how to fight. Pursuing The Bear first, Darius and Lukas follow his trail and discover that Siveth has traveled with them, disguised as Lukas' horse. Darius departs after a heated argument with Siveth, leaving her and Lukas to face The Bear and his band of raiders. While trying to kill Lukas during the fight, The Bear falls to his death, pleasing Lukas much to Siveth's dismay.

They later subdue The Wolf. Lukas threatens to kill him, but Siveth says The Wolf is more valuable alive, so they take him captive when he agrees to lead them to The Snake and Scorpion. The Wolf keeps his word but, as Darius blunders into the ambush, he escapes, losing an arm to Siveth's ice breath. Despite this, they capture The Snake, and Lukas learns Siveth and Darius are bonded. Questioning what to do with their prisoner, Siveth tells Lukas to spare her and take her back to town to face justice, while Darius says to kill the raider; to dissuade Darius, Siveth explains why she shared her heart with him. When Darius was a child, the king started a war to bolster his popularity and distract people from his corrupt dealings; the king was wounded in battle while Siveth tried to prove his corruption. The king had his wagon driver run Darius's parents off the road during his return to the castle, killing them. Siveth then shared her heart with Darius to save him, leading to her refusal to help Razvan and her banishment. She kept the truth from Darius to protect him. Darius reluctantly agrees to spare The Snake, having discovered the raiders were receiving messages.

After delivering The Snake to the local jail, Darius learns King Razvan is behind the raiders' attacks, ordering them to kill his subjects to prevent starvation because he did not prepare for food shortages. Meanwhile, Lukas, with Siveth's help, flirts with Oana, the town healer, having met her earlier. The Scorpion returns for The Snake and frees her, poisoning Oana's father, the town's jailer, and setting his house ablaze to cover their escape; Siveth uses her ice breath to douse the flames and regroups with Darius and Lukas. Darius tells them his discovery, so Siveth tries to retrieve the raiders' orders from the king's guards who took them. As Siveth uses her shapeshifting to try and reclaim the evidence, Lukas and Darius pursue The Snake and Scorpion, wandering into an ambush. During the fight, The Scorpion poisons Lukas, and The Snake further wounds him in battle. Darius is also injured, and Siveth abandons her mission to save Lukas and Darius after seeing them in trouble through their bond. Darius kills The Scorpion, and Siveth kills The Snake. Lukas apologizes for letting revenge darken his heart. Darius and Siveth also reconcile, and he begs her to save Lukas. Siveth takes Lukas to the monastery that raised Darius; weeks pass, and Lukas recovers with Oana's help. King Razvan and a crowd of townsfolk confront Lukas and Siveth shortly thereafter; the king orders Lukas to be surrendered for crimes he did not commit and orders Siveth to resume her exile. However, Siveth refuses, calling Razvan out for his crimes against the people. Then Darius and the recaptured Wolf appear, with The Wolf revealing his part in Razvan's schemes. Siveth offers her protection to anyone else willing to speak up; more people come forward from the king's guards and council to confess to Razvan's corruption, leading to his and The Wolf's imprisonment.

In the time that follows, Siveth is welcomed back into society and shares the crop seed she saved to end the local famine. Lukas rebuilds his home, beginning a relationship with Oana. Now recognized by the kingdom for his bond with Siveth, Darius lives a happy life among the people. Darius reflects on Siveth's teachings, acknowledging that she showed him and Lukas the path to happiness, friendship, and love.

Cast 
 Joseph Millson as Darius
 Jack Kane as Lukas
 Arturo Muselli as King Razvan
 Carolina Carlsson as The Snake
 Tam Williams as The Scorpion
 Richard Ashton as The Wolf
 Ross O'Hennessy as The Bear
 Cameron Jack as Blacksmith
 Fabienne Piolini-Castle as Oana
 Helena Bonham Carter as Siveth (voice)

Development

Production 
Development of the script for the fifth film began directly after Battle for the Heartfire'''s completion.

 Filming 
Filming began in early November 2018 in Romania and ended on December 5. Locations include Râșnov Fortress, the volcanic crater in Racoș, and Bran Castle also in Mogoșoaia Palace. Post-production ended in September 2019.

 Visual effects 
The VFX company returned to do the CGI effects after working on the previous two films.

 Music 

The score was composed by Mark McKenzie, after previously composing the score for Dragonheart: A New Beginning, The Sorcerer's Curse and Battle for the Heartfire. Like the previous films, the score includes Randy Edelman's original Dragonheart theme from the first film.

 Reception 

 Sequel 
According to an interview with Arturo Muselli, a sixth Dragonheart'' film has already entered pre-production.

References

External links 
 
 

2020 films
2020s fantasy adventure films
English-language Romanian films
Direct-to-video prequel films
Arthurian films
Direct-to-video fantasy films
Universal Pictures direct-to-video films
Films about dragons
Films shot in Romania
Dragonheart films
Films produced by Raffaella De Laurentiis
Romanian fantasy films
American fantasy adventure films
2020 fantasy films
2020s English-language films
2020s American films